"Dissident" is a song by American rock band Pearl Jam, appearing as the fifth track on their second studio album, Vs. (1993). It was written by band members Eddie Vedder, Jeff Ament, Stone Gossard, Mike McCready, and Dave Abbruzzese. According to Vedder, "Dissident" is about a woman who secretly shelters a refugee but eventually turns him into the authorities because she cannot support him any longer, leading her to feel guilty about her decision.

"Dissident" was released as the fourth single from Vs. on May 16, 1994. It peaked at number three on the US Billboard Album Rock Tracks chart and in Denmark, number two in Norway, and number seven in Finland and Ireland. "Dissident (Part 2)" was also released as a single, reaching number two in the Netherlands and number 19 in France, and two live versions of the track found success in Denmark and Norway.

The song was included on Pearl Jam's 2004 greatest hits album, rearviewmirror (Greatest Hits 1991–2003).

Lyrical content
Pearl Jam lead vocalist Eddie Vedder said about the song "Dissident":
In "Dissident," I'm actually talking about a woman who takes in someone who's being sought after by the authorities for political reasons. He's on the run, and she offers him a refuge. But she just can't handle the responsibility. She turns him in, then she has to live with the guilt and the realization that she's betrayed the one thing that gave her life meaning. It made her life difficult. It made her life hell. But it gave her a reason to be. But she couldn't hold on. She folded. That's the tragedy of the song.

At Pearl Jam's March 17, 1994, concert in West Lafayette, Indiana at Purdue University's Elliot Hall, Vedder said that the "holy no" in the song refers to date rape, explaining that "a woman's word is sacred and the no means no and that's what a 'holy no' is."

Release and reception
While the "Dissident" single was released commercially to international markets on May 16, 1994, the commercial single was not released in the United States until June 27, 1995, and was only available as a more expensive import version beforehand. "Dissident" peaked at number three on the Billboard Album Rock Tracks chart (now called the Mainstream Rock chart). Outside the United States, the song peaked at number 97 in Germany, reached the top 30 in France, and was a top-10 success in Denmark, Finland, Ireland, and Norway. It was additionally a top-20 success in the Netherlands and the United Kingdom. Part two of "Dissident" reached number two in the Netherlands and the top 20 in France; in the former country, it was the fourth highest-selling single of the year according to the Single Top 100 listing.

Live performances
"Dissident" was first performed live at the band's May 13, 1993, concert in San Francisco, California at Slim's Café. Live performances of "Dissident" can be found on the "Dissident" single, various official bootlegs, and the Live at the Gorge 05/06 box set. A performance of the song is also included on the DVD Touring Band 2000.

Track listings
All songs were written by Dave Abbruzzese, Jeff Ament, Stone Gossard, Mike McCready, and Eddie Vedder, except where noted.

CD (US, Austria, Germany, Japan, and South Africa) – part 1
 "Dissident" – 3:51
 "Release" (live) (Ament, Gossard, Dave Krusen, McCready, Vedder) – 4:55
 "Rearviewmirror" (live) – 5:31
 "Even Flow" (live) (Vedder, Gossard) – 5:05
 "Dissident" (live) – 3:25
 "Why Go" (live) (Vedder, Ament) – 3:50
 "Deep" (live) (Vedder, Gossard, Ament) – 4:42
 Live tracks recorded on April 3, 1994, at the Fox Theatre in Atlanta, Georgia.

CD (US, Austria, Germany, Japan, and South Africa) – part 2
 "Jeremy" (live) – 3:00
 "Glorified G" (live) – 3:19
 "Daughter" (live) – 5:07
 "Go" (live) – 2:57
 "Animal" (live) – 2:48
 "Garden" (live) – 6:52
 "State of Love and Trust" (live) – 3:58
 "Black" (live) – 5:45
 Live tracks recorded on April 3, 1994, at the Fox Theatre in Atlanta, Georgia

CD (US, Austria, Germany, Japan, and South Africa) – part 3
 "Alive" (live) – 5:08
 "Blood" (live) – 3:39
 "W.M.A." (live) – 6:24
 "Elderly Woman Behind the Counter in a Small Town" (live) – 3:43
 "Rats" (live) – 4:37
 "Once" (live) – 3:21
 "Porch" (live) – 11:01
 "Indifference" (live) – 5:00
 Live tracks recorded on April 3, 1994, at the Fox Theatre in Atlanta, Georgia

UK CD1
 "Dissident" – 3:32
 "Release" (live) (Ament, Gossard, Krusen, McCready, Vedder) / "Rearviewmirror" (live) / "Even Flow" (live) (Vedder, Gossard) – 15:22
 Live tracks recorded on April 3, 1994, at the Fox Theatre in Atlanta, Georgia.

UK CD2, "Dissident (Part 2)"
 "Dissident" – 3:32
 "Dissident" (live) / "Why Go" (live) (Vedder, Ament) / "Deep" (live) (Vedder, Gossard, Ament) – 11:52
 Live tracks recorded on April 3, 1994, at the Fox Theatre in Atlanta, Georgia.

CD (Europe)
 "Dissident" – 3:35
 "Release" (live) (Ament, Gossard, Krusen, McCready, Vedder)
 Recorded on April 3, 1994, at the Fox Theatre in Atlanta, Georgia.

7-inch vinyl (Europe)
A. "Dissident" – 3:32
B. "Rearviewmirror" (live) – 5:08
 Recorded on April 3, 1994, at the Fox Theatre in Atlanta, Georgia.

"Dissident"/Live in Atlanta
Altogether, the three "Dissident" singles compile the band's April 3, 1994, concert in Atlanta, Georgia, with the only omissions being three songs from the yet-to-be-released Vitalogy ("Whipping", "Better Man", and "Satan's Bed") and the Dead Boys cover "Sonic Reducer". All three singles were available as a box set entitled Live in Atlanta released in Europe. Discs two and three became commercial hits in Denmark and Norway, where they peaked within the top five in both countries.

Disc one
 "Dissident"
 "Release" (live) (Ament, Gossard, Krusen, McCready, Vedder)
 "Rearviewmirror" (live)
 "Even Flow" (live) (Vedder, Gossard)
 "Dissident" (live)
 "Why Go" (live) (Vedder, Ament)
 "Deep" (live) (Vedder, Gossard, Ament)

Disc two
 "Jeremy" (live) (Vedder, Ament)
 "Glorified G" (live)
 "Daughter" (live)
 "Go" (live)
 "Animal" (live)
 "Garden" (live) (Vedder, Gossard, Ament)
 "State of Love and Trust" (live) (Vedder, McCready, Ament)
 "Black" (live) (Vedder, Gossard)

Disc three
 "Alive" (live) (Vedder, Gossard)
 "Blood" (live)
 "W.M.A." (live) (with Doug Pinnick and Jerry Gaskill of King's X)
 "Elderly Woman Behind the Counter in a Small Town" (live)
 "Rats" (live)
 "Once" (live) (Vedder, Gossard)
 "Porch" (live) (Vedder)
 "Indifference" (live)
 Live tracks recorded on April 3, 1994, at the Fox Theatre in Atlanta, Georgia.

Charts

Weekly charts

"Dissident"

"Dissident (Part 2)"

Live in Atlanta 2

Live in Atlanta 3

Year-end charts
"Dissident (Part 2)"

References

External links
 Lyrics at pearljam.com

1993 songs
1994 singles
Epic Records singles
Pearl Jam songs
Song recordings produced by Brendan O'Brien (record producer)
Song recordings produced by Eddie Vedder
Song recordings produced by Jeff Ament
Song recordings produced by Mike McCready
Song recordings produced by Stone Gossard
Songs written by Dave Abbruzzese
Songs written by Eddie Vedder
Songs written by Jeff Ament
Songs written by Mike McCready
Songs written by Stone Gossard